The 2020–21 Hellenic Football League season was the 68th in the history of the Hellenic Football League, a football competition in England. The league operates a number of divisions, three of which were in the English football league system, the Premier Division at Step 5 and the two regionally split Divisions One, East and West, at Step 6.

The allocations for Steps 5 and 6 for season 2020–21 were announced by the FA on 21 July, and were subject to appeal.

The 2020–21 season started in September and was suspended in December a result of the Covid-19 pandemic. The league season was subsequently abandoned on 24 February 2021.

Promotions and restructuring
The scheduled restructuring of non-League football took place at the end of the season, with new divisions added to the Combined Counties and the United Counties Leagues at Step 5 for 2021-22, along with an additional division in the Northern Premier League at Step 4. Promotions from Steps 5 to 4 and 6 to 5 were based on points per game across all matches over the two cancelled seasons (2019-20 and 2020-21), while teams were promoted to Step 6 on the basis of a subjective application process. Consequently, the East and West divisions merged into one group for the next season.

Premier Division

The Premier Division comprised 18 teams, one less than the previous season, following the resignation of Brackley Town Saints.

League table

Division One East

Division One East comprised 15 teams, two less than the previous season, following the resignations of Didcot Town reserves and Marlow United.

League table

Division One West

Division One West comprised 15 teams, one less than the previous season, following the resignation of New College Swindon.

League table

Division Two East

Division Two East featured 15 new clubs:
Penn & Tylers Green reserves, transferred from Division Two South
Yateley United, transferred from Division Two South
Wokingham & Emmbrook reserves, transferred from Division Two South
Hazlemere Sports, transferred from Division Two South
Chalvey Sports reserves, transferred from Division Two South
Chalfont Wasps, transferred from Division Two South
Taplow United, transferred from Division Two South
Stokenchurch, transferred from Division Two South
Chinnor, transferred from Division Two North
Cove Under 23
FC Beaconsfield
Flackwell Heath reserves
Holmer Green development
Watlington Town, joined from the North Berks League
Westfield reserves

League table

Division Two North

Division Two North featured 10 clubs which competed in the division last season, along with 4 new clubs:
Ardley United development
Aston Clinton reserves, transferred from Division Two South
Kidlington development
Thame United reserves

League table

Division Two South

Division Two South featured 2 clubs which competed in the division last season, along with 12 new clubs:
Abingdon United development, rejoined the League
Clanfield reserves, transferred from Division Two West
Faringdon Town, transferred from Division Two West
Highworth Town reserves, transferred from Division Two West
Letcombe, transferred from Division Two West
Shrivenham reserves, transferred from Division Two West
Wantage Town development, transferred from Division Two West
Woodstock Town, transferred from Division Two North
Hungerford Town Swifts
Kintbury Rangers
Swindon Supermarine development
Woodcote & Stoke Rows, joined from the Thames Valley Premier Football League

League table

Division Two West

Division Two West featured 2 clubs which competed in the division last season, along with 12 new clubs:
Moreton Rangers reserves, transferred from Division Two North
Bourton Rovers reserves
Cricklade Town reserves
Evesham United development
Hartpury University
Kington Town
Malvern Town development
SC Inkberrow
Shipston Excelsior, transferred from Midland League
Shortwood United reserves
Slimbridge reserves
Tuffley Rovers development

League table

References

External links
 Official Site

2020–21
9
Association football events curtailed and voided due to the COVID-19 pandemic